Aanund Hylland (born 19 October 1949) is a Norwegian economist.

He completed a master's degree in mathematical logic at the University of Oslo in 1974, and a Ph.D. at the John F. Kennedy School of Government, Harvard University in 1980. He worked at the University of Oslo and BI Norwegian Business School from 1983, and in 1991, he was promoted to professor at the University of Oslo. He was the dean of the Faculty of Social Sciences from 1996 to 1998.

He is a member of the Norwegian Academy of Science and Letters. He was the vice chairman of the board of the Norwegian Institute for Social Research from 2005 to 2008, and was re-elected for the term 2009 to 2012.

References

1949 births
Living people
Norwegian economists
University of Oslo alumni
Academic staff of the University of Oslo
Norwegian expatriates in the United States
Members of the Norwegian Academy of Science and Letters
Harvard Kennedy School alumni